Kılcan is a village in the Elbeyli District, Kilis Province, Turkey. The village had a population of 92 in 2022.

References

Villages in Elbeyli District